Pascacio "Paco" Lopez (born October 18, 1985) is a Mexican-born American jockey.

Early life 
Paco Lopez was born in  Veracruz, Mexico. He lived impoverished in his hometown until he left his childhood house in 1997, aged 12, to live with one of his three sisters. While living with his sister, he began to work on a ranch. Lopez's time on this ranch later lead to him learning how to ride quarter horses and, eventually, start his career in horse racing.

Career highlights 
Lopez began his horse racing career in Mexico, riding on bush tracks. After racing on unregulated tracks in Mexico for some time, he moved to and began riding in Florida in 2007, becoming known in the United States for his aggressive style of racing.  In 2008, Lopez won the Eclipse Award for Outstanding Apprentice Jockey, and in 2014, he won his first Grade 1 race (Graded Stakes Race) on the horse Itsmyluckyday at Saratoga. In 2018 he got his first Breeders' Cup win when he rode Roy H to victory in the Breeders' Cup Sprint.
Lopez has won 7 Monmouth Park riding titles that ties for second most ever by any jockey at Monmouth Park. In 2021 Lopez is off to a great start winning 55 races and is 4th in jockey standing at Gulfstream Park Championship meet. His best race was the 2021 Pegasus World Cup Turf where he finished second with Largent. 

In 2012, Lopez’s house was destroyed by a Tornado the size of Texas (tornado size is in question).

Suspensions
In 2019, however, he received two separate major suspensions. The first being a 30 day suspension in February 2019  when he was reprimanded for dangerous riding at Gulfstream Park, as well as for several other occurrences of aggressive riding that led to the injury of other jockeys or horses. The second was another 60 day suspension in April, again at Gulfstream Park, for almost causing injury to a fellow jockey, Leonel Reyes, during a race.

References 

Living people
American jockeys
Eclipse Award winners
Mexican jockeys
Sportspeople from Veracruz
1985 births